Salem West or 'Salem (West)' is a state assembly constituency in the Indian state of Tamil Nadu that was formed after the constituency delimitations of 2007. Its State Assembly Constituency number is 88. The previous constituencies—Salem I and Salem II—were redrawn as Salem North, Salem South and Salem West. It comprises portions of the Omalur and Salem taluks. It is a part of the wider Salem constituency for national elections to the Parliament of India. It is one of the 234 State Legislative Assembly Constituencies in Tamil Nadu.

Boundaries
Salem West consists of the following parts in its limits:

 Omalur Taluk (part): Muthunaickenpatti, Chellapillaikuttai, Pagalpatti, Manguppai, Saminayakkanpatti, Kottagoundampatti, Anaigoundampatti, Vellakkalpatti, T.Konagapadi, Alagusamudram and Karukkalvadi villages.
 Salem taluk (part):
Sarkar Gollappatti, A.Ayyamperumalpatti, Chettichavadi, Kondappanayakkanpatti, M. Palapatti and Selathampatti villages.
Thalavaipatti (CT) and Mallamooppampatti (CT).
Salem Municipal Corporation Wards - No.1 to 5 and No.17 to 25

Elections

Election results

2021

2016

2011

References

Assembly constituencies of Tamil Nadu
Salem district
Government of Salem, Tamil Nadu